Swelling may refer to:
Edema, a transient abnormal enlargement of a body part or area not caused by a tumor
Die swell, the increase in cross-sectional area of a polymer after it exits an extrusion die
Swelling capacity, the amount of liquid that can be absorbed by a polymer
Neutron-induced swelling, the increasing of volume and decreasing of density of materials subjected to intense neutron radiation
 Swelling index

See also
Shrinkage (disambiguation)
Swell (disambiguation)